The Aberdare Times was a weekly English-language newspaper based in south Wales. Its circulation was mainly in Merthyr Tydfil, Hirwaun, Mountain Ash, Pontypridd, Neath Valley, Rhondda and Cardiff.

The paper had Labour/Liberal tendencies and its main content was local news. At its inception, Josiah Thomas Jones (1799–1873) was the owner, publisher and editor.

Welsh Newspapers Online has digitised more than 1,700 issues of the Aberdare Times (1861–1902) from the National Library of Wales's newspaper collection.

See also
The Gwron (1856–1860)
The Aberdare Leader (1902–1991)

References 

Newspapers published in Wales